Kanıt ("Evidence") is a Turkish television mystery series.

The 100-episode detective series was aired in 2010–2013 by Kanal D and reaired in 2017–2018 by Teve2. The format of the series differs from a typical detective series. It is claimed that the stories are partially based on true life stories. Professor Sevil Atasoy, an expert in forensic science is the narrator and interrupts during the story and explains the evidences and methods of the detectives. Her motto is "There is no perfect murder".

The producer is Abdullah Oğuz, the scenarist is Ahmet Saatcioğlu and the directors are Cem Sürücü and Biray Dalkıran. The main recurrent characters are the chief inspector, the inspector, crime scene investigator, the criminology laborant, the  autopsy doctor and the informatics expert (After episode 40). Also two times a second inspector briefly joines the staff. Both the crime scene investigator and the criminologist were changed three times during the 100 episode.

References

2010 Turkish television series debuts
2013 Turkish television series endings
Turkish television series
Kanal D original programming
Mystery television series
Forensic science in popular culture